The 1910–11 Irish Cup was the 31st edition of the premier knock-out cup competition in Irish football.

Shelbourne won the tournament for the 2nd time, defeating Bohemians 2–1 in the final replay after a 0-0 draw in the original final.

Results

First round

|}

1 Glentoran originally won the tie played at Bohemians 1-0, but Bohemians protested after Glentoran played a player who was not on the pre-match teamsheet. Glentoran were subsequently expelled from the competition and Bohemians were reinstated.

Replays

|}

Second replay

|}

Third replay

|}

Second round

|}

1 Linfield originally won the tie played at Derry Celtic 3–2, but a replay was ordered after a protest by Derry Celtic that the pitch was unplayable and that the correct kick-off time was not adhered to by the referee. Linfield refused to play a replay and subsequently withdrew from the competition with Derry Celtic advancing to the semi-finals.

Semi-finals

|}

Replay

|}

Second replay

|}

Final

Replay

References

External links
 Northern Ireland Cup Finals. Rec.Sport.Soccer Statistics Foundation (RSSSF)

Irish Cup seasons
1910–11 domestic association football cups
1910–11 in Irish association football